Oakleigh Football Club, nicknamed the Devils, was an Australian rules football club from Oakleigh which played in the VFA from 1929 until 1994. Oakleigh wore purple guernseys with a gold monogram thus giving them their original nickname the Purple and Golds.

History
The club was formed in 1891 and after having success in the Melbourne Districts Association (premierships in 1907, 1924, & 1928), they were one of two teams admitted into the VFA in 1929, the other being Sandringham.

With former Essendon star player and coach, and future Fitzroy and Carlton coach Frank Maher in charge they won a premiership in just their second season with a 9-point win over Northcote in a very spiteful game, 9.6 (60) to 7.9 (51). The game had erupted into full scale violence during the last term when a Northcote defender elbowed an Oakleigh forward in the face and an all in brawl, involving a number of spectators as well as most players, ensued. Under the rules of the time, Oakleigh would have been able to challenge Northcote the following week if they had lost this game as they had finished as minor premiers after the home and away matches preceding the finals series. The two sides met once more in the Grand Final the following year and Oakleigh again got the better of Northcote, winning by 3 points despite kicking inaccurately, 10.14 (74) to 11.5 (71).

It would be the last time the club saw finals football until 1949 when they made it all the way to the Grand Final before losing when a Williamstown player kicked a goal with only seconds to play to put his team in front. They earned the minor premiership the following season and outplayed Port Melbourne to win their third premiership. In 1952 the teams met again in the Grand Final and Oakleigh won comfortably.

Another drought ensued and Oakleigh didn't make the finals again until 1959. They won their 5th premiership in 1960 despite not being able to play at their home ground which was having resurfacing work.

In 1966 Oakleigh was demoted to the second division by finishing bottom of the first division but won the second division premiership by defeating Geelong West in the Grand Final in 1967 and returned to the top flight for 1968. In the following decade they made consecutive Grand Final appearances in 1972, 1973 and 1974; The 1972 grand final saw them defeat Dandenong in a high scoring match, 25.17 (167) to 18.15 (123). The success from this saw the club secure a lucrative three-year $80k sponsorship deal from Transtours in 1975, making it financially the most well-backed club in the Association; but in spite of this its on-field performances quickly deteriorated and the club finished last in 1976 to be relegated again.

Oakleigh remained in the second division for the rest of that division's existence, losing a number of grand finals along the way, until 1988 when they finally won the premiership. At the end of this season, the two division format was scrapped and all of the existing VFA clubs were merged into one competition for the following season. Oakleigh struggled to make an impact in the recombined competition and never managed to move far off the bottom of the ladder again.

At the end of 1994, when administration of the VFA was turned over to the Victorian State Football League, Oakleigh left the Association as part of the VSFL's efforts to reduce the size of the VFA and align it with the TAC Cup (Under 18s competition); Oakleigh's identity was carried on within the TAC Cup from 1995, when the new Oakleigh Chargers club was established to represent the south-east. The Chargers were one of two additional metropolitan clubs introduced to the TAC Cup in 1995 as part of a plan by the AFL to replace the traditional club zones with independent junior clubs. They are based at Warrawee Park in Oakleigh, representing the southeastern suburban area of Melbourne.

Premierships
Melbourne District Association
1907, 1924, 1928
Victorian Football Association
 1930, 1931, 1950, 1952, 1960, 1967 (2nd division), 1972, 1988 (2nd division)

VFA Club Records

Notable players

 Carlton – Jack Howell, Bryan Quirk, Ian Robertson and Simon Verbeek.
 Collingwood – Bill Jones, Heath Shephard and Alby Pannam.
 Essendon – Frank Maher.
 Fitzroy – Clen Denning (also Carlton)
 Footscray/Western Bulldogs Alan Thorpe
 Geelong – Eric Fleming
 Hawthorn — Frank Nolan
 Melbourne – Neil Crompton, Bob Johnson and Kevin Dyson
 Richmond – George Rudolph, Tony Jewell, Bill Barrot, George Smeaton, Graham Gaunt, Terry Smith and Clive Watson
 South Melbourne – Herbie Matthews.
 St Kilda – Wally Gunnyon and Eric Guy.
 Richard Di Natale - Australian Senator 2010-. Leader, Australian Greens 2015-
 Keith Schleiger - (T.V personality The Block).
Shane Rogers - National Recruiting Manager Carlton Football Club
Cory Young - Liston Trophy
Joe Garbiou - Liston Trophy
Derek King – Liston Trophy and Field Medal.
 Brian Matthey - J Field Medal
Rino Pretto – 874 career goals for Oakleigh, and one of only two men to have kicked 1000 VFA/VFL goals.

References

Fiddian, Marc: Devils at Play. A History of the Oakleigh Football Club, Pakenham Gazette, Pakenham 1982
Fiddian, Marc: The Roar of the Crowd : A History of VFA Grand Finals, Victorian Football Association, Jolimont, 1987

External links

Fullpointsfooty

Oakleigh Football Club
Australian rules football clubs in Melbourne
1891 establishments in Australia
Australian rules football clubs established in 1891
1994 disestablishments in Australia
Australian rules football clubs disestablished in 1994